Marula (IAST: Mārulā; fl. 13th century or earlier) was a Sanskrit-language poetess from India. Her verses are included in early medieval Sanskrit anthologies, including Sharngadhara's Paddhati and Jalhana's Suktimuktavali.

Date 

Marula's verses are included in Sanskrit anthologies such as Jalhana's Suktimuktavali (13th century) and Sharngadhara's Paddhati (14th century). So, she must have lived in the 13th century or earlier, although her exact period is not certain.

She must have been a famous poet of her time, for a verse attributed to Dhanadadevas in Sharngadhara's Paddhati names her among four notable women poets:

Example verses 

Only five of Marula's verses are now extant. The following verse is about a woman separated from her lover:

References

Bibliography 

 
 

Sanskrit-language women poets
Sanskrit poets
Indian women poets